Laura Flaqué Centellas (born 21 August 1963) is a Spanish former freestyle swimmer who competed in the 1980 Summer Olympics.

Now she works in institute Ferran Tallada in Barcelona

Notes

References

External links 
 
 
 
 

1963 births
Living people
Spanish female freestyle swimmers
Olympic swimmers of Spain
Swimmers at the 1980 Summer Olympics
20th-century Spanish women